Gheorghe Ola (10 October 1928 – 1995) was a Romanian footballer and manager.

Honours

Manager 
Romania
 UEFA European Under-18 Championship: 1962

References

1928 births
1995 deaths
People from Cluj County
Romanian footballers
FC Steaua București managers
FC Steaua București assistant managers
Romania national football team managers
FC Sportul Studențesc București managers
FC Olimpia Satu Mare managers
FCV Farul Constanța managers
Association footballers not categorized by position
Romanian football managers